Ludvig Mariboe Benjamin Aubert (22 November 1838 – 5 February 1896) was a Norwegian professor, jurist and  government official.

Biography
Aubert was born at Christiania (now Oslo), Norway. He was the son of professor Ludvig Cæsar Martin Aubert (1807-1887) and his wife Ida Dorothea Mariboe (1811–1900). Aubert's brother was art educator and historian Fredrik Ludvig Andreas Vibe Aubert (1851–1913).  

From 1855, Aubert was a law student at the University of Christiania (now University of Oslo) graduating Cand.jur. in 1860. He started his career  as a magistrate at Nord-Gudbrandsdal District Court. Aubert was engaged as a university fellow  and in 1864  became a lecturer. Aubert was a professor of law at the University of Oslo from 1866. He published noted works of legal history, comparative law and commercial law.

A moderate Conservative, Aubert also served as Minister of Justice from April to June 1884 with
the Schweigaard Government.
 

Aubert was married to noted author Elise Sofie Aars (1837–1909). Among their children were jurist Vilhelm Mariboe Aubert (1868-1908) and film critic  Sofie Aubert Lindbæk (1875–1953).

References

1838 births
1896 deaths
Academic staff of the Faculty of Law, University of Oslo
University of Oslo alumni
Government ministers of Norway
19th-century Norwegian politicians
Burials at the Cemetery of Our Saviour
Ministers of Justice of Norway
Politicians from Oslo
d'Aubert family